Michael Francis Dunham (born June 1, 1972) is an American former professional ice hockey goaltender. Dunham is the Boston Bruins goalie development coach, and the former head goaltending coach for the New York Islanders of the National Hockey League (NHL).

Playing career
Dunham attended Canterbury School in New Milford, Connecticut, a Catholic boarding school, where he was an All-New England 1st Team Goalie under legendary prep school coach Charlie Huntington. Dunham played college hockey for the University of Maine, where he shared the goaltending duties with Garth Snow.  The team won the NCAA Men's Ice Hockey Championship in Dunham's final season, 1992–93.

He was drafted in the 3rd round (53rd overall) of the 1990 NHL Entry Draft by the New Jersey Devils. He won the Calder Cup in 1995 with the Albany River Rats. He also won the William M. Jennings Trophy with Martin Brodeur after the 1996–97 NHL season. During the 1998 expansion draft, Mike Dunham was selected by the Nashville Predators where he played four seasons splitting the starting role with Tomáš Vokoun. He also played for the New York Rangers, Atlanta Thrashers, and New York Islanders. He participated in the 2002 Winter Olympic Games, helping the United States win the silver medal. During the NHL lockout 2004-05, Dunham played with Skellefteå AIK in Sweden to make a team boost for the end of season. Dunham has a career record of 141–178–39–5, with a 2.74 goals against average, 90.8% save percentage, and 19 shutouts.

Coaching
On September 10, 2007, Dunham was named goaltending coach of the New York Islanders. The move ended his 11-year NHL playing career. He left the Islanders in July 2017 after 10 years to become the Boston Bruins goalie development coach in August 2017.

Career statistics

Regular season and playoffs

International

Awards and honors

 Binghamton Hockey Hall Of Fame. Inducted Friday March 13, 2009 (w/Glenn Merkosky)

References

External links
 
 

1972 births
Living people
Albany River Rats players
American men's ice hockey goaltenders
Atlanta Thrashers players
Boston Bruins coaches
Canterbury School (Connecticut) alumni
Gwinnett Gladiators players
Ice hockey players from New York (state)
Ice hockey players at the 1994 Winter Olympics
Ice hockey players at the 2002 Winter Olympics
Maine Black Bears men's ice hockey players
Medalists at the 2002 Winter Olympics
Milwaukee Admirals (IHL) players
Nashville Predators players
New Jersey Devils players
New York Islanders coaches
New York Islanders players
New York Rangers players
New Jersey Devils draft picks
Olympic silver medalists for the United States in ice hockey
People from Johnson City, New York
Skellefteå AIK players
William M. Jennings Trophy winners
NCAA men's ice hockey national champions
AHCA Division I men's ice hockey All-Americans